The 1924 Bucknell Bison football team was an American football team that represented Bucknell University as an independent during the 1924 college football season. In its first season under head coach Charley Moran, the team compiled an 8–2 record.

The team played its home games at the newly-constructed Bucknell Memorial Stadium in Lewisburg, Pennsylvania.

Schedule

References

Bucknell
Bucknell Bison football seasons
Bucknell Bison football